Arlie Russell Hochschild (born January 15, 1940) is an American professor emeritus of sociology at the University of California, Berkeley and writer.  Hochschild has long focused on the human emotions that underlie moral beliefs, practices, and social life generally. She is the author of nine books including, most recently, Strangers in Their Own Land: Anger and Mourning on the American Right, a finalist for the National Book Award. In The Second Shift, The Managed Heart,  The Time Bind, and many of her other books, she continues the tradition of C. Wright Mills by drawing links between his concepts of private troubles and public issues. Hochschild has a personal fascination with the relationship between peoples inner experiences and outer appearance, so Mills’ concepts were very influential in the direction of her later works in studying emotion sociologically. His influence can be seen quite clearly in Strangers in Their Own Land: Anger and Mourning on the American Right where she analyzes the lives of immigrants for her emotion research.

Hochschild seeks to make visible the underlying role of emotion and the work of managing it, the paid form of which she calls "emotional labor."  For her, "the expression and management of emotion are social processes. What people feel and express depend on societal norms, one's social category and position, and cultural factors."

In 2021 she was elected to the American Philosophical Society. Additionally, she is a member of various other sociological societies; such as the American Sociological Association, the Gerontological Society of America, the Sociological Research Association, the Sociologists for Women in Society, and the American Federation of Teachers.

Biography

Early life and family background 
Hochschild was born in Boston, Massachusetts, the daughter of Ruth Alene (Libbey) and Francis Henry Russell, a diplomat who served in Israel, New Zealand, Ghana, and Tunisia. Arlie Hochschild grew up in a household where her mother was the primary caregiver and her father was the provider. Her mother "volunteered for the PTA, and helped start a preschool program in Montgomery County, Maryland, all the while supporting [her] father's job as a government official and diplomat" (Hochschild, Commercialization, p. 3). Hochschild drew on her childhood experiences to study and write on caregiving and having a loving relationship with your children. In the preface of her book, The Commercialization of Intimate Life, she says that her mother was a wonderful woman who committed her life to care for her family and was excellent at it, but who never appeared pleased doing so. Hochschild has been married to her husband, writer Adam Hochschild, since June 1965. They met at a Quaker work camp in Spanish Harlem when she was 20 and he was 17. Although they aren’t practicing Quakers, they still like to embody some of the Quaker values, which are also what drew her to Swarthmore. She later became a mother herself and raised two sons named David Russell and Gabriel Russell.

In Hochschild's early life, she became fascinated with the boundaries people draw between inner experience and outer appearance.

As she writes in the preface to her book The Managed Heart: the Commercialization of Human Feeling, "I found myself passing a dish of peanuts among many guests and looking up at their smiles; diplomatic smiles can look different when seen from below than when seen straight on. Afterward, I would listen to my mother and father interpret various gestures. The tight smile of the Bulgarian emissary, the averted glance of the Chinese consul . . . I learned to convey messages not simply from person to person but from Sofia to Washington, from Peking to Paris, and from Paris to Washington. Had I passed the peanuts to a person, I wondered, or to an actor? Where did the person end and the act begin? Just how is a person related to an act?" The Managed Heart: the Commercialization of Human Feeling explores how we grapple with the emotions we are truly feeling versus the emotions we think we are supposed to feel.

Overall, Hochschild is a vibrant and curious person, who dedicates herself to her work and draws inspiration and content from her own experiences and surroundings. In this way, “By making herself a player in this evolving social phenomenon, she’s signaling, “You’re not just an insect being scientifically inspected by the white-coated scientists.” " She is passionate about studying phenomena that affect everyday people and is dedicated to using her own life as a vehicle to learn. She has traveled to an infertility clinic in India to personally interview pregnancy surrogates, where she interacted with poor women who were “paid to carry fetuses for infertile American couples.” Here, she met an Indian journalist, Aditya Ghosh, who she later helped to get a Ph.D.

Education and academic career 
Hochschild graduated from Swarthmore College in 1962 where she majored in International Relations and was a member of the political action group and the peace corp committee. After, she earned her M.A. and Ph.D. from the University of California, Berkeley, whose faculty she soon joined. She wrote her first book, The Unexpected Community: Portrait of an Old Age Subculture, which was focused on how community affects the differences in elderly peoples' mental health, in 1973. As a graduate student, Hochschild was greatly inspired by the writings of Erving Goffman and C. Wright Mills. In White Collar, Mills argued that we "sell our personality." This resonated with Hochschild, however, she felt that more needed to be added. As she writes,

"Mills seemed to assume that in order to sell personality, one need only have it. Yet simply having personality does not make one a diplomat, any more than having muscles makes one an athlete. What was missing was a sense of the active emotional labor involved in the selling. This labor, it seemed to me, might be one part of a distinctly patterned yet invisible emotional system—a system composed of individual acts of 'emotion work,' social 'feeling rules,' and a great variety of exchanges between people in private and public life."

Hochschild went on to create concepts that illuminate the power of emotion in social life.

Politics 
Although Hochschild identifies as more “left-leaning” politically, her work shows consideration and reflection on those opposite of her on the political spectrum. While she may not agree with them politically, she understands the importance of learning and connecting with those who do not agree with her personally on politics. In her book Strangers in Their Own Land - Anger and Mourning on the American Right, she discusses the motives behind members of the Tea Party learning about them and how their lives led them to support political figures such as Donald Trump. As well, she tries to see if a liberal like herself can empathize with people who voted for him.

Hochschild can be passionate about her political leanings, but she is equally willing to put them aside to try and learn from those who do not think similarly to her. She quotes in the discussion of Strangers in Their Own Land:

"What I’m really interested in is understanding how people feel. I’m not focusing pragmatically on policies, but trying to get into what it would feel like to be a person who has a certain set of experiences and lives in a certain social world and has certain news sources. I think that in itself is the whole project — turning your alarm system off and really listening."

Hochschild's sociological theories

Emotion as a social norm

Through her work, Hochschild proclaims that human emotions—joy, sadness, anger, elation, jealousy, envy, despair—are, in large part, social. Each culture, she argues, provides us with prototypes of feeling which, like the different keys on a piano, attune us to different inner notes. She provides an example of the Tahitians, who have one word, "sick," for what in other cultures might correspond to envy, depression, grief, or sadness.

Culture guides the act of recognizing a feeling by proposing what's possible for us to feel. In The Managed Heart Hochschild cites the Czech novelist Milan Kundera, who writes that the Czech word "litost" refers to an indefinable longing, mixed with remorse and grief—a constellation of feelings with no equivalent in any other language. It is not that non-Czechs never feel litost, she notes; it is that they are not, in the same way, invited to lift out and affirm the feeling.

Apart from what we think a feeling is, Hochschild asserts in The Managed Heart, we have ideas about what it should be. We say, "You should be thrilled at winning the prize" or "You must be furious at what he did." We evaluate the fit between feeling and context in light of what she calls "feeling rules," which are themselves deeply rooted in culture. In light of such feeling rules, we try to manage our feelings—i.e., we try to be happy at a party, or grief-stricken at a funeral. In all of these ways—our experience of an interaction, our definition of feeling, our appraisal, and management of feeling—feeling is social.

In Hochschild's later work, she introduces the "concept of "framing rules", which provide the context for feeling rules." She explains that framing rules are the "rules governing how we see situations" and how they "point to the cognitive, meaningful, and interpretive frame within which feeling rules are situated." An example that clarifies the relationship between framing rules and feeling rules would be:
"The norm that women should be at home is a framing rule, while the norm to feel happy about being at home or to feel guilty about being absent, is a feeling rule."

Emotional expression and management are learned in the private sphere, then later through participation in public life.

Emotional labor

"Emotional labor", a term first defined by Hochschild, refers to the management of one's feelings and expressions based on the emotional requirements of a job. For example, in The Managed Heart, Hochschild writes of how flight attendants are trained to control passengers' feelings during times of turbulence and dangerous situations while suppressing their fear or anxiety. Bill collectors, as well, are often trained to imagine debtors as lazy or dishonest, so they can feel suspicious and intimidating. As the number of service jobs grows, so too does the amount of kinds of emotional labor. In the era of COVID-19, she argues, many front-line workers will do the emotional labor of suppressing heightened anxieties about their own health and that of their families while dealing with the fear, anxiety and sometimes hostility of the public.

Hochschild also explores the concepts of ‘feeling rules’ and emotional labor as they relate to class structure and how it can vary based on economic or social class. For example, she argues that middle class families prepare their children for emotion management more than working class families. Similarly, the level of emotion management taught in a family is often related to the type of job the parent holds. A bank manager, for example, which is typically a middle class job, might need more ‘feeling rules’ than a working class job, which might instead involve more external behavior, such as assembling car parts. Overall, Hochschild argues that, “Given the general pattern of class inheritance, each class tends to prepare its children with the skills necessary to ‘its’ type of work environment and to pass on class-appropriate ways.” In other words, middle class parents tend to try to control feelings, whereas working class parents tend to control behavior and/or consequences. Overall, she claims that the way in which we are taught to manage our feelings and emotions can depend heavily on our economic class and how we are raised.  

Finally, Hochschild argues, emotional labor has gone global. In her essay, "Love and Gold," in Global Woman she describes immigrant care workers who leave their children and elderly back in the Philippines, Mexico or elsewhere in the global South, to take paid jobs caring for the young and elderly in families in the affluent North. Such jobs call on workers to manage grief and anguish vis-a-vis their own long-unseen children, spouses, and elderly parents, even as they try to feel—and genuinely do feel—warm attachment to the children and elders they daily care for in the North. In an interview with Journal of Consumer Culture, Hochschild focuses on the emotional labor of female immigrants, "So you have women from the Philippines, Sri Lanka, India, and Mexico leaving their children and elderly behind to take jobs caring for American, Canadian, Saudi, and European children and elderly. It was also not uncommon to hear nannies say, 'I love the kids I take care of now more than my own. I hate to say it, but I do'". "Extending from the eldest daughter in a rural village who takes care of siblings while a mother cares for an employer's children in the city of a poor country to that employer's employer—and children—in a rich country, outsourcing care work creates a global care chain with a different emotional task at each link of it." Hochschild coined the term global care chain to refer to "a pattern of women leaving their own families in developing countries to care for the children of well-off families." These networks are created by the worldwide exchange of domestic services, which connect women all over the world. She connects her ideas about emotional labor to Richard Sennett's concept about "hidden injuries". Hochschild writes:

"The idea of emotional labor—and of a sociology of emotions in general—helps illuminate the "hidden injuries," to quote Richard Sennett, of all the systems we study, including the latest versions of sexism, racism, and capitalism".

Work and family

In other books, Hochschild applies her perspective on emotion to the American family. In The Second Shift, she argues that the family has been stuck in a "stalled revolution." Most mothers work for pay outside the home; that is the revolution. But the jobs they have and the men they come home to haven't changed as rapidly or deeply as she has; that is the stall. Hochschild argues couples have implicit "gender ideologies" when they marry; the marital role that the women will take on the domestic duties within a home. Mothers, specifically working mothers end up doing the lion's share of the work—both emotional and physical—of tending the home, which leads her to feel resentment. Hence, when a mother is working full time during the day and must come home to perform the majority of the domestic work, this is her "second shift".  Hochschild traces links between a couple's division of labor and their underlying "economy of gratitude." Who, she asks, is grateful to whom, and for what? Even those who can balance work and family life face some difficulties. This includes a variety of high-funded daycare options, jobs with little flexibility for missing work to care for a sick child, school schedules that are based on having a stay at home parent, and the assumption that mothers will work a "second shift," meaning they will still take on the majority of domestic labor (Hochschild 1989). To be clear, Hochschild doesn't “advocate a simple return to traditional motherhood.” Instead, she is pushing for more equality of roles in society: for both genders to share the responsibilities of home life, creating a more manageable balance for mothers.

In The Time Bind, Hochschild studied working parents at a Fortune 500 company dealing with an important contradiction.  On one hand, nearly everyone she talked to told her that "my family comes first." However, she argues that working parents in the United States put in long hours at work not because "employers demand long hours nor out of financial need, but because their work lives are more rewarding than their home lives." For this reason, working parents feel a magnetic draw to work. For about a fifth of these working parents, she found home felt like work and work felt like home. When she asked informants "Where do you get help when you need it?" or "Where are you most rewarded for what you do, work or home?" often the answer was work. One man told her, "When I'm doing the right thing with my teenage son, chances are he's giving me hell for it. When I'm doing the right thing at work, my boss is clapping me on my back."  She found, handled this strain in several ways. One way was to reduce their idea of what they needed. ("Oh, I don't really need time to unwind.")  Another was to outsource personal tasks.  A third was to develop an imaginary self, the self you would be if only you had time. The "time bind" refers to the lack of time parents had to themselves, the feeling that they were always running late, and the thought that they were confined to the limited hours of the day. Thus, in the "time bind" Hochschild denotes this paradox of "reversed worlds, in which family becomes like work and work takes on the feel and tone of the family."

Hochschild goes on to “suggest that the flight into work is coerced at least as much as it is voluntary.” Because of a pervading feeling of dissatisfaction in home life, and a greater sense of home being given at work, Americans have taken refuge in their work more than ever before. Hochschild described a friend on maternity leave who felt that her time at home with her newborn was at the expense of ‘sacrificing’ time at work. Furthermore, Hochschild acknowledges that this discontent with home life prompts more questions such as, “What kind of gratification do people get when they commit to the workplace as an alternative to the dissatisfactions of home life? And, why are people dissatisfied at home?” She does mention that one component could include the fact that contemporary managerial practices have started emphasizing a cohesive workplace family and a unified corporate culture”. 

Ultimately, Hochschild hopes for a society where “the desire to work doesn’t automatically trump the desire to raise children.” In order for this shift to occur, she argues, there is a need to challenge the culture of time as a measure of work commitment. This would involve a greater awareness of a variety of needs and preferences of working parents.

In an interview with Journal of Consumer Culture, Hochschild describes how capitalism plays a role in one's "imaginary self". She explains, "Many workers put in long hours, and return home exhausted. They turn to television as a form of passive 'recovery' from work. In the four hours of television, they're exposed to thousands of amusing, fun advertisements. Those ads function as a conveyor belt to the mall. At the mall, they spend the money they've earned on objects that function as totems to a 'potential self' or hypothetical self – a self we would be if only we had time". It is also a self in danger of being perpetually in emotional debt to loved ones.

Politics and emotion
Hochschild describes herself as politically liberal and religiously agnostic. 

Her latest book, Strangers in Their Own Land: Anger and Mourning on the American Right, is based on five years of immersion research among Louisiana supporters of the Tea Party. It explores the role of emotion in politics by first posing a paradox.  Why she asks, do residents of the nation's second poorest state vote for candidates who resist federal help? Why in a highly polluted state, do they vote for politicians reluctant to regulate polluting industries?  Her search for answers leads her to the concept of the "deep story."  A deep story is a story that feels true about a highly salient feature of life. One takes facts out of a deep story. One takes moral precepts out of the deep story. What remains is simply what feels true about a highly salient issue, and can be described through a metaphor, as the experience of "waiting in line" for a valued reward, and witnessing unwelcome "line-cutters." Everyone, she argues, has a deep story—and for many on the right, it reflects a keen sense of decline, the sting of scorn, and the sense of being a stranger in one's land. In a 2020 OpEd for The Guardian, she proposes the concept of "emotional strategy"—a strategy of focusing primarily on emotion—which many politicians pursue as a minor part of an overall strategy, and others pursue as a central project. She has added other "chapters" to the deep story that have occurred since 2016, which she relates in an interview Derik Thompson conducted with her in "The Deep Story of Trumpism" for the Atlantic Monthly. She's suggested other ideas on politics through OpEds and book reviews.

Hochschild's work also describes the many ways in which each individual becomes a shock absorber of larger forces and focuses on the impact of these forces on emotion.

Looking again at Hochschild's concept of "global care chains," there have been more initiatives to feminize global migration with a concentration on these care chains. (Hochschild 2000, 2002) When northern or Western women enter the paid labor market, they typically hire other women to care for their children and other dependents, most often what is considered a more poor woman from a developing country. Migrant caregivers are regularly forced to abandon their children in their home countries to be cared for by even destitute caregivers or family members who are already caring for others or working. The growth of global care networks has been impacted because of several reasons. In affluent countries, the entry of women into labor has resulted in high demand for paid domestic employees, with no corresponding increases in public childcare or gender-based distribution of extra requirements.

Disengagement theory 
Hochschild critiqued the disengagement theory of aging. According to that theory, inevitably and universally, through disengagement, the individual experiences a social death before they experience physical death. This could be seen through an individual beginning to reduce the amount of "roles" they have in their life and society, leaving them with less obligations in their life, making it easier for them to accept a nearer death. There are different "norms" of aging, she suggests, and ways of actually experiencing near-death and death. Specifically, Hochschild argues that the theory of disengagement itself is ‘unfalsifiable,’ partly because the conception or assessment of aging can vary based on the researcher and their constitution of aging. She also points out that a person’s age with implied relation to death and society’s stance towards disengagement is an independent variable, whereas the dependent variable is disengagement itself. In this way, the relation between age and disengagement can be modified. In the low-income housing project she studied for her PhD Dissertation and later, The Unexpected Community, for example, the residents - a lively group of elderly midwestern women seemed to die un-disengaged, i.e "with their boots on." She even points out that “a higher proportion of women in their sixties actually have a larger "life space" than do those in their fifties.”  One example of this is that older women are more likely to see their children on the same or previous day than younger women, meaning they may have more opportunity for social engagement. Across the world's cultures and sub-cultures, she suggests, groups and individuals differ in their ideals of aging. These various groups of people and individuals have differences in the feeling rules they apply to their experience of aging, dying and death. Thus leading to them all experiencing these phenomena, dying and death, differently. However, it is important to note that she has considered the fact that disengagement has happened in all aspects of life thorough all time. She quotes "it must happen sometime in the individual's future if it is not happening now; it is also intrinsic, which I take to mean that social factors alone do not cause it".

Honors

Hochschild has received eight Honorary Doctoral Degrees from, respectively, Harvard University, 2021, Swarthmore College, 1993, Aalborg University, 2004 (Denmark), the University of Oslo, 2000, (Norway), the University of Lapland, 2012, (Finland), Mount St. Vincent University, 2013 (Canada), Westminster College (Pennsylvania), 2018 (U.S.) and University of Lausanne, 2018 (Switzerland). She also received the Ulysses Medal from University College Dublin, 2015 Ireland, and was elected to the American Philosophical Society, 2021.

Hochschild was a finalist for the 2016 National Book Award for Strangers In Their Own Land: Anger and Mourning on the American Right and the book was a New York Times Bestseller.  The book was also listed by the New York Times as one of "6 Books to Help Understand Trump's Win" (November 9, 2016.)  She was also awarded a prize for this book (translated by Xia Fan and published by SSAP) in 2020 by the Beijing News Book Review, Beijing, Mainland China.

Hochschild has also won Guggenheim, Fulbright and Mellon fellowships, and three awards granted by the American Sociological Association—the Charles Cooley Award (for The Managed Heart) the Jessie Bernard Award (for The Second Shift, The Time Bind and Global Woman), and the Award for Public Understanding of Sociology (for lifetime achievement). In awarding Hochschild the Jessie Bernard Award, she was observed for her "creative genius for framing questions and lines of insight, often condensed into memorable, paradigm-shifting words and phrases."

The Managed Heart, The Second Shift, The Time Bind, and Strangers In Their Own Land have been named "Notable Books of the Year" by The New York Times.
The Outsourced Self: Intimate Life in Market Times was chosen by Publishers Weekly as one of the "Best Books of 2012." The last chapter was excerpted in The New York Times (May 5, 2012). In 2022, Hochschild was inducted into the California Hall of Fame.

Quotes 
"Most women without children spend much more time than men on housework; with children, they devote more time to both housework and child care. Just as there is a wage gap between men and women in the workplace, there is a "leisure gap" between them at home. Most women work one shift at the office or factory and a "second shift" at home."

"The more anxious, isolated and time-deprived we are, the more likely we are to turn to paid personal services. To finance these extra services, we work longer hours. This leaves less time to spend with family, friends and neighbors; we become less likely to call on them for help, and they on us."

"For many of us, work is the one place where we feel appreciated. The things that we long to experience at home- pride in our accomplishments, laughter and fun, relationships that aren't complex- we sometimes experience most often in the office. Bosses applaud us when we do a good job. Co-workers become a kind of family we feel we fit into."

"The deal we made with the workplace wasn't made with families in mind: to work year-round in eight hour workdays through thick and thin, newborns, normal childhood illnesses, difficulties at school, elderly people getting sick. In whose interest is this? And can't we change it, making of two nine-hour days three six hour days, creating an extra job and making life livable for everyone?"

"Formerly, many men dominated women within marriage. Now, despite a much wider acceptance of women as workers, men dominate women anonymously outside the marriage. Patriarchy has not disappeared; it has changed form. In the old form, women were forced to obey an overbearing husband in the privacy of an unjust marriage. In the new form, the working single mother is economically abandoned by her former husband and ignored by a patriarchal society at large."

"Men who shared the load at home seemed just as pressed for time as their wives, and torn between the demands of career and small children...But the majority of men did not share the load at home. Some refused outright. Others refused more passively, often offering a loving shoulder to lean on, an understanding ear as their working wife faced the conflict they both saw as hers."

"It is not that we have the truth and they have the norms. We have norms too. Weber, Marx, Durkheim, Simmel, Tönnies, Horkheimer, Fromm - all of us have norms. But as sociologists, we don't just have norms. We use norms. They are our research tools, our measuring rods, and with those in hand, we get surprised, and dismayed by many things. In fact, for me, the very best of sociology is animated by a deeply disciplined dismay - its true of all the greats."

Legacy

Within sociology, Hochschild is known as the founder of the sociology of emotion and, outside of it, as a public sociologist, contributing to publications, such as The New York Times op-ed page and Book Review, The Washington Post, Mother Jones, The American Prospect, Harper's Magazine, The Progressive and The New York Review of Books.

Concepts developed by Hochschild, such as "emotional labor," "feeling rules", the "economy of gratitude," and "global care chains" have been adopted by scholars in a range of disciplines. Capturing a range of research and debate, a collection published in 2011, At the Heart of Work and Family: Engaging the Ideas of Arlie Hochschild, critically explores some of her key concepts.

Another collection of papers devoted to her work is Pathways to Empathy: New Studies on Commodification, Emotional Labor and Time Binds (2013) edited by Gertraud Koch and Stephanie Everke Buchanan (Campus Verlag-Arbeit und Alltag, University of Chicago Press). The book is based on papers given at an "International Workshop in Honour of Hochschild" at Zeppelin University, Friedrichshafen, Germany (November 12–13, 2011).

A monograph by Madalena d'Oliviera-Martins entitled Arlie Russell Hochschild: Un Camino Hacia El Corazon De La Sociologia explores the main ideas found in her work.  (Centro de Investigaciones Sociologicas, Monograph 309, 242 ps,  Montalban, 8, 28014, Madrid, Spain, 2018).  Her work appears in 16 languages.

"Hochschildian Sociology" 
Through research and education on her various social theories, some students and sociologists have come to practice what they call "Hochschildian Sociology" in which they build on her ideas. This idea is reflected on within the book, At the Heart of Work and Family: Engaging The Ideas of Arlie Hochschild, which is based on further exploring many of the sociological theories created by her. It has been noted before that Hochschild has done much to help engage and work with those who have been inspired to study her particular social theories further. As revealed in the book, "Hochschildian Sociology" works to analyze concerns within families, children, and "the private life". As well, it asks us to look at how relationships between people are shaped by our emotions and commitments to both our private and public lives, especially in consideration of the workforce. The influence Hochschild has over contemporary sociology can be proven by the fact that other sociologists look to create ways of thinking based on her own work.

Bibliography

Books 
 
 
 
  
  
 
 
 
 

Juvenile fiction

Essays and reporting

See also
 Commercialization of love
 Emotion work
 Emotional labor
 Time bind
 The Second Shift
 Feeling rules
 Strangers in Their Own Land

References

Further reading

 Greco, Monica, Carmen Leccardi, Roberta Sassatelli and Arlie Hochschild. "Roundtable on and with A. R. Hochschild, Rassegna Italiana di Sociologia," October/December 2014, pp. 819–840.
 Mazzarela, Marete. 2014. "How to Turn Emotions into Capital," Svenska Dagbladet (February 27).
 Smith, Stephen. 2014. "Arlie Russell Hochschild: Spacious Sociologies of Emotion," Oxford Handbook of Sociology, Social Theory, and Organization Studies: Contemporary Currents, (edited by Paul Adler, Paul du Gay, Glenn Morgan and Mike Reed).
 Introduction by A. Grandey, in Emotional Labor in the 21st Century: Diverse Perspectives on Emotion Regulation at Work (2013) by Grandey, A., Diefendorff, J.A., & Rupp, D. (Eds.). New York, NY: Psychology Press/Routledge.
 Kimmel, Sherri. 2013. "A Playful Spirit," Swarthmore College Bulletin, April, A Playful Spirit - Swarthmore College Bulletin.
 Koch, Gertraud, & Stephanie Everke Buchanan (eds). 2013. Pathways to Empathy: New Studies on Commodification, Emotional Labor and Time Binds. Campus Verlag-Arbeit und Alltag, University of Chicago Press. (The book is based on papers given at an "International Workshop in Honour of Arlie Russell Hochschild," Zeppelin University, Friedrichshafen, Germany (November 12–13, 2011).)
 Garey, Anita Ilta and Karen V. Hansen. 2011. "Introduction: An Eye on Emotion in the Study of Families and Work." pp. 1–14 in At the Heart of Work and Family: Engaging the Ideas of Arlie Hochschild, edited by Anita Ilta Garey and Karen V. Hansen. New Brunswick: NJ.
 Wharton, Amy S. 2011. "The Sociology of Arlie Hochschild", Work and Occupations, 38(4), pp. 459–464.
 Alis, David. 2009. "Travail Emotionnel, Dissonance Emotionnelle, et Contrefaçon De I'Intimité: Vingt-Cinq Ans Après La Publication de Managed Heart d'Arlie R. Hochschild." in Politiques de L'Intime, edited by I. Berrebi-Hoffmann. Paris, France: Editions La Decouverte.
 Sakiyama, Haruo. 2008. "Theoretical Contribution of Arlie Hochschild" (in Japanese). In Japanese Handbook of Sociology, edited by S. Inoue and K. Ito. Kyoto, Japan: Sekai-Shiso-Sya
 Farganis, James. 2007. Readings in Social Theory: The Classic Tradition to Post-Modernism. Boston, MA: McGraw-Hill.
 Wilson, N. H., & Lande, B. J. 2005. Feeling Capitalism: A Conversation with Arlie Hochschild. Sage Publications, Ltd.
 Skucinska, Anna. 2002. "Nowe Obszary Utowardowienia" (in Czech).
 Adams, Bert N. and R.A. Sydie. 2001. Sociological Theory. Thousand Oaks, CA: Pine Forge Press.
 Hanninen, Vilma, Jukka Partanen, and Oili-Helena Ylijoki, eds. 2001. Sosiaalipsykologian Suunnannäyttäjiä. Tampere, Finland: Vastapaino.
 Smith, Stephen Lloyd. 1999. "Arlie Hochschild: Soft-spoken Conservationist of Emotions: Review and Assessment of Arlie Hochschild's work," in Soundings, Issue 11 – Emotional Labour, Spring 1999, pp. 120–127.
 Williams, Simon J. 1998. Chapter 18. pp. 240–251 in Key Sociological Thinkers, edited by R. Stones. New York: New York University Press.

External links

 Arlie Russell Hochschild page at UC Berkeley
 Biography in Context
 The Outsourced Life (NYTimes.com: May 5, 2012)
 Key Pedagogic Thinkers
 Emotional Labor Around the World: An Interview with Arlie Hochschild
What Drives Trump Supporters?: Sociologist Arlie Russell Hochschild on Anger & Mourning of the Right
Arlie Russell Hochschild on "Strangers in Their Own Land: Anger and Mourning on the America" Part 2
"The Homes in Dorian's Path are in a High-Risk Area. Why Do They Cost So Much?" (The New York Times, September 4, 2019)
"How the White Working Class is Being Destroyed" (The New York Times, March 17, 2020)
When a Pandemic Strikes Americans Who Are Already Suffering (The New York Times, March 20, 2020)

1940 births
Living people
American sociologists
American women sociologists
Family sociologists
Feminist studies scholars
Arlie
Members of the American Philosophical Society
The New Republic people
Swarthmore College alumni
University of California, Berkeley College of Letters and Science faculty